Stefanidovka is a rural locality (a khutor) in Novopostoyalovskoye Rural Settlement, Rossoshansky District, Voronezh Oblast, Russia. The population was 52 as of 2010.

Geography 
Stefanidovka is located 17 km northwest of Rossosh (the district's administrative centre) by road. Drozdovo is the nearest rural locality.

References 

Rural localities in Rossoshansky District